Olle Ericsson or Eriksson may refer to:

 Olle Ericsson (sport shooter) (1890–1950), Swedish sport shooter
 Olle Eriksson (footballer, born 1918) (1918–2006), Swedish football coach
 Olle Eriksson (footballer, born 1928) (born 1928), Swedish football player and manager
 Olle Eriksson (politician) (1925–1983), Swedish politician